Rajeev Madhavan is a serial entrepreneur and investor, and a founder and General Partner of Clear Ventures. He is perhaps best known as the founder of software company Magma Design Automation, where he served as chairman and chief executive officer from its founding in 1997 through its acquisition by Synopsys in 2012. He also co-founded software companies LogicVision (acquired by Mentor Graphics) and Ambit Design Systems (acquired by Cadence Design Systems). Red Herring magazine named Madhavan to its "Top Innovators" list in 2002.

Early life and education

Madhavan was born in India and founded his first company as a teenager when he created a comic book rental business, conducting transactions on the school bus. He earned a bachelor's degree in Electronics and Communications from the National Institute of Technology Karnataka, India, and later earned a master's degree in Electrical Engineering from Queen's University in Canada. After graduation Madhavan worked at Bell-Northern Research and later at Cadence Design Systems.

LogicVision and Ambit

In the early 1990s, Madhavan was involved in founding his first two software companies. In 1991, he left Cadence to co-found LogicVision, an Electronic Design Automation (EDA) company offering chip, board and system-level design for testing (DFT) solutions and support to ASIC vendors. Madhavan also served as the company's first Director of Engineering. LogicVision went public on Nasdaq under the ticker symbol LGVN in October 2001, raising $40.5 million. It was acquired by Mentor Graphics in 2009.

In 1994, Madhavan founded Ambit Design Systems, an EDA company which offered synthesis technology. He served as President and Chairman. Ambit was acquired for $260 million by Cadence in September 1998.

Magma Design Automation

In 1997, Madhavan led a team which founded EDA company Magma Design Automation, where he served as Chairman and President from the company's inception. Magma initially competed with Cadence and Avanti Corporation in physical design, but it eventually broadened its product portfolio to compete with all three of the largest established EDA companies (Cadence, Mentor Graphics and Synopsys). Magma had a particularly strong presence in the convergence device segment through key customers such as Qualcomm, Broadcom and Texas Instruments.

Magma completed an initial public offering on Nasdaq, under the ticker symbol LAVA, on November 20, 2001 — the last EDA company to go public — and achieved its peak annual revenue of $214.4 million in its 2008 fiscal year. Magma was the fourth largest EDA company by revenue.

In 2002, Magma was named to the Red Herring 100 for innovation and business strategy. In 2005, Forbes ranked Magma No. 2 on its list of fastest-growing technology companies.

Acquisitions

Magma conducted a number of acquisitions under Madhavan, among them: Moscape, 2000; Silicon Metrics, 2003; Mojave, 2004; ACAD Corp., 2006; Knights Technology, 2006; and Sabio Labs, 2008.

Patent dispute

Magma was involved in a legal dispute with Synopsys beginning in September 2004, when Synopsys sued Magma for allegedly infringing two patents. Claims and counter-claims accelerated, resulting in separate court cases in California and Delaware, and a number of disputed patents. On March 29, 2007, Magma and Synopsys announced the companies had agreed to settle all pending litigation between them. As part of the settlement Magma made a $12.5 million payment to Synopsys and each company cross-licensed four previously disputed patents to the other.

Synopsys acquisition

Magma was acquired by Synopsys at a cash valuation of about $523 million in a transaction finalized on February 22, 2012.

Clear Ventures

Madhavan began to work with venture capitalist Christopher Rust in 2014 to create a new technology venture capital firm, Clear Ventures. Clear Ventures was publicly announced in 2016 with $120 million in committed capital, exceeding the founders' capital formation target of $80 million. Clear Ventures' active portfolio companies at the time of the public launch included Cyphort, Espresa, Falcon Computing, Paysa, Reflektion, Robin Systems, Swift Navigation and Vera.

Awards and recognition

Red Herring magazine named Madhavan to its "Top Innovators" list in 2002.

Madhavan was named to the UCLA Henry Samueli School of Engineering and Applied Science Dean's Advisory Council in 2005.

In 2008, Madhavan was elected to the Electronic Design Automation Consortium board of directors.

Investments and board seats

Madhavan makes investments in and sits on boards for startup companies in a range of industries, including data science and machine learning, mobile technology and social media.

Avaamo
Secure mobile messaging for business.

Reflektion
Predictive analytics platform for retailers and brands. Madhavan serves on the Reflektion board of directors.

Robin Systems

Infrastructure for big data and analytics. Madhavan is chairman of the Robin Systems board of directors.

Virtual Power Systems

Controls power and IT in data centers to increase utilization and reliability. Madhavan serves on the board of directors.

References

External links 
 Clear Ventures website

Living people
American technology company founders
Businesspeople in software
Year of birth missing (living people)